In Love with Life is a 1934 American pre-Code film directed by Frank R. Strayer.

Plot summary
Sharon is a penniless widow, forced to seek help from her father, Morley, a wealthy financier, who didn't approve of her marriage. Morley agrees to take in his grandson, Laury, but declares Sharon can never see her son again.

Morley hires Professor John Applegate to tutor Laury. John secretly keeps Sharon informed of her son's welfare. When the stock market crashes Morley uses his own fortune to help his investors. John proposes to Sharon. Morley, now humbled by his financial loses, reconciles with his daughter.

Production
The film was shot in Los Angeles, California. Twelve child performers from the Meglin School made appearances in the Kiddie Kabaret scenes.

Cast
Lila Lee as Sharon
Dickie Moore as Laurence (Laury)
Onslow Stevens as Professor John Applegate
Claude Gillingwater as Morley
Rosita Marstini as Brouquet
Clarence Geldart as Barlow
Tom Ricketts as Book Store Proprietor

References

External links

Synopsis, allmovie.com

1934 films
1934 drama films
American black-and-white films
Films directed by Frank R. Strayer
American drama films
Chesterfield Pictures films
1930s English-language films
1930s American films